William Edward Griggs III (born August 4, 1962) is a former professional American football tight end for the New York Jets. Bill went to college at the University of Virginia and played tight end under the legendary UVA Head Coach George Welsh. Bill played for the Jets from 1984 to 1989, catching 25 passes for 262 yards.  His first NFL reception was a touchdown catch in the Jets victory over the Kansas City Chiefs in the 1986 playoffs.  He served as the offensive line and defensive line coach at Pennsauken High School in Pennsauken, New Jersey in 2011.

References

1962 births
Living people
American football tight ends
New York Jets players
Virginia Cavaliers football players
High school football coaches in New Jersey
Sportspeople from Philadelphia
Sportspeople from Camden, New Jersey
Players of American football from Camden, New Jersey
Players of American football from Philadelphia